Perfect Hair Forever is an American adult animated television series created by Mike Lazzo, Matt Harrigan, and Matt Maiellaro for Cartoon Network's late night programming block Adult Swim. The series revolves around a young boy named Gerald Bald Z and his quest to find perfect hair.

Perfect Hair Forever premiered on November 7, 2004, and ended on April 1, 2007, with a total of 7 episodes. Two additional episodes premiered unannounced on April 1, 2014, as part of Adult Swim's annual April Fools' Day stunt. The series is a spin-off of Space Ghost Coast to Coast.

Premise
The series concerns a young boy named Gerald who is on a quest to find the perfect hair to remedy his premature baldness.  He is joined on his wanderings by an array of strange companions. Gerald is opposed by the evil Coiffio and his minions for reasons which are never stated in the series.

The series is a spin-off of Space Ghost Coast to Coast, due to a special featuring Space Ghost, Adult Swim Brain Trust, coming on right after the premiere of the series to help tie it together.

Space Ghost appears in every episode, either as a character with an actual role, or in the background.

Production
Perfect Hair Forever employs an ongoing serial format, a style that had been uncommon to previous Williams Street projects with their lack of emphasis on continuity. Each episode of the series features different opening sequence music and visuals. The style and music of the end credits also varies from episode to episode.

Following the first six episodes, members of the Perfect Hair Forever creative team posted (on the official Adult Swim message board) that they weren't interested in continuing the show to a second season. Cancellation was formally announced at the Adult Swim panel at Comic-Con 2006.

In October 2006, Adultswim.com stated that Perfect Hair Forever was back in production with 16 episodes to be aired on its online streaming network The Fix, though after episode seven aired, the series was never continued.

Episode 7 aired April 1, 2007, as part of Adult Swim's annual April Fool's Day joke, and was also available on Adult Swim's The Fix website.

In 2007, the Japanese noise rock band Melt-Banana recorded the song "Hair-Cat (Cause the Wolf Is a Cat!)" for Perfect Hair Forever.

Broadcast history
The Perfect Hair Forever pilot first aired on November 7, 2004, in the time slot that had been advertised as the premiere of the Squidbillies pilot. Unknown to the audience at the time, the existing Squidbillies pilot had fallen behind and wasn't ready to air. Williams Street continued advertising the Squidbillies premiere up to and including the bump directly preceding the show, which talked about wanting to make the show "perfect" for you and your "hair" "forever", revealing the title "Perfect Hair Forever." The night's confusion continued when, instead of seeing the opening titles for Squidbillies, viewers were confronted with a title card for an episode of Space Ghost called "Perfect Hair Forever", thus starting the pilot episode.

After the ending credits ran, a bumper card appeared, apologizing for the apparent scheduling mix up, only for it to fade out to a fake "Technical Difficulties" card featuring a selection of Perfect Hair Forever characters. This was shown on screen for several seconds, accompanied by typical music, before the card faded to static whilst the Action Hot Dog's "Do da la la la la!" echoed.  The card returned, and the music was replaced with a techno remix of Action Hot Dog's chant.

The first season of Perfect Hair Forever premiered on Sunday, November 27, 2005, at 12:30 AM Eastern Standard Time with the airing of the second episode.  The pilot re-aired on November 20, 2005, though without the Adult Swim Brain Trust discussion spoof.

Season 2 was supposed to contain 16 episodes, and was planned to premiere online on Adult Swim Video. On May 22, 2007, "Return to Balding Victory" debuted on Adult Swim Video, officially ending the series. This episode had already aired on television on April 1, 2007, as part of Adult Swim's April Fool's Joke. This joke spanned the entire block, beginning with this episode and then airing all of season one in reverse order and in the style of old VHS fansubs, complete with Engrish subtitles on most episodes.  Occasionally, instead of the Engrish subtitles, transcripts from other Adult Swim shows were presented instead. It replaced scheduled premieres of Bleach, Blood+, and Eureka Seven. The prank was hinted at, though, as the schedule listed the same episodes that were to be shown that weekend for the next weekend ahead of time.

Seven years after the series conclusion, an eighth episode was produced and aired unannounced on April 1, 2014, as part of Adult Swim's 2014 April Fools' Stunt. Two versions of this episode, "Muscular Distraction - A" and "Muscular Distraction - B," exist and were aired at 12:00 AM and 12:15 AM, respectively.

Characters

 Gerald Bald Z (Kim Manning) – The main protagonist of the story, Gerald, is a young boy suffering from premature hair loss. Because of this, he goes off on a journey to acquire "Perfect Hair Forever".  He is portrayed as a sometimes melancholy, yet optimistic young lad who believes that his goal is possible. His name is a play on the anime series, Dragon Ball Z.
 Uncle Grandfather (Matt Maiellaro) – Described by producer Matt Harrigan as a "bald, pot-bellied, dirty old man," Uncle Grandfather is Gerald's father figure of sorts. He spends almost all of his time snacking, watching Brenda put on lewd displays, or reading pornography. He also exhibits a stereotypical Asian speech impediment, where he pronounces English 'l' sounds as 'r' sounds.
 Brenda – A silent girl whose only means of dialogue is a non-English language, and she is kept by Uncle Grandfather to bring him trays of hamburgers and satisfy his perverted needs.
 Action Hotdog (Will Armstrong) – The first character to join Gerald's journey. Action Hotdog is a hot dog which flies around and is only capable of uttering the words "Doo da la-la-la-la-la-la la la-la-laaaaa-la-la!".
 Norman Douglas (Nick Ingkatanuwat) – A talking tree, also known as the Inappropriate Comedy Tree. Originally an agent of Coiffio, his task was to follow Gerald and watch him.
 Terry/Twisty (Dave Hughes) – A sapient tornado. When he is Terry his eyes are blue, and he seems nice and kind, and when he is Twisty his eyes are red, and he is violent.
 Coiffio (Dave Willis) – The main villain of the series, Coiffio is a self-centered old man with an enormous, multi-colored "coif" atop his head, who otherwise looks like a more fit version of Uncle Grandfather with a slightly different beard. He speaks in an odd, indeterminable accent.
 Catman (Dennis Moloney) – A grumpy, fat man in a catsuit who is Coiffio's main henchman. Catman lives in a large, litterbox-shaped house, and is shown working at a convenience store in several episodes.
 Young Man (C. Martin Croker) – A young, enthusiastic man in a bright purple suit that claims to be from the "Ministry of Planning" and calls himself the "King of All Animals".
 Sherman (MF Doom) - A giraffe that travels primarily with Young Man and his other Animals.
 Rod: the Anime God (Matt Maiellaro) – An entity made of fire, who calls himself the god of anime. Rod is introduced early in the series and pops in at random intervals. Rod is the focus of a secondary plot in the series, involving Coffio attempting to sell him a house.
 Space Ghost (George Lowe) - Makes a number of random appearances throughout the show.

Episodes

Series overview

Season 1 (2004–05)

Season 2 (2007)

Season Bald (2014)

International broadcast 
In Canada, Perfect Hair Forever previously aired on Teletoon's Teletoon at Night block and on the Canadian version of Adult Swim.

Home media
On October 27, 2009, Adult Swim and distributor Warner Home Video released Adult Swim in a Box, a seven-disc DVD box set of various Adult Swim shows.

The pilot episode of Perfect Hair Forever appears in this set. In June 2010, the individual DVD was made briefly available for purchase at the Adult Swim website store.

The first season was released on iTunes. The entire series has been made available for free streaming on the Adult Swim website.

See also
 Gēmusetto, another anime parody series produced by Williams Street

References

External links

 
 
 Perfect Hair Central (archived)

Space Ghost Coast to Coast
2000s American adult animated television series
2000s American black comedy television series
2000s American mystery television series
2000s American surreal comedy television series
2010s American adult animated television series
2010s American black comedy television series
2010s American mystery television series
2010s American surreal comedy television series
2004 American television series debuts
2014 American television series endings
American adult animated comedy television series
American adult animated mystery television series
American adult animated television spin-offs
Anime-influenced Western animated television series
English-language television shows
Adult Swim original programming
American television series revived after cancellation
Television series by Williams Street
Television series created by Mike Lazzo
Television series created by Matt Maiellaro
Television series created by Matt Harrigan